The 45 cm naval rocket was a rocket artillery system used by garrison troops of the Imperial Japanese Navy during the late stages of World War II in defense of island bases in the Pacific.

Design   
The 45 cm naval rocket was first discovered during the Battle of Luzon. It was a spin-stabilized rocket that was filled with 39 sticks of solid propellant weighing  and the exhaust gasses were forced through six venturis that were angled at 18° to impart spin.

The body of the motor, warhead and nose cone were all made from  rolled steel and were welded together.  The warhead contained  of trinitroanisole and in the center of the nose cone, there was a pocket that could house either a Navy nose fuze as used by the 20 cm naval rocket or Army mortar fuze.

The launcher was a two-wheeled wooden cart with a metal baseplate that held the base of the rocket.  The rocket was launched by pulling a lanyard which tripped a spring powered hammer at the bottom left of the launcher which set off a percussion cap which started the rocket motor.  The launcher could only be used once because the force of the launch destroyed the launcher.

Four more rockets were later tested at Aberdeen Maryland proving grounds and they were able to reach . However, the accuracy of the rocket was said to be poor so they couldn't be fired at a specific target but were instead fired towards a target and may have been more useful as a siege weapon.

Gallery

References

World War II artillery of Japan
Rocket artillery
450 mm artillery
Military equipment introduced from 1940 to 1944